Subwave is an alternative rock band from Nuremberg/Germany.

History 
The band was set up 1997 by Sven Kartscher (voc/git), Guido Seibelt (dr) und Felix Schnetzer (bs) and published their first studio album in the year 2000 ironically titled Kurt Cobain.

After finishing of the production of their second album Reject in 2002 the line-up changed when F. Schnetzer und G. Seibelt left the band. After many changeovers over the years, in 2005 Patrik Leuchauer (bs) and Moritz Kruedener (dr) joined in as new band members.

Several of their songs were published on German and international compilations, were put on the play lists of national stations and got airplay even at college-radios overseas.

Meanwhile, Kai Wingenfelder (singer of the popular German rock band Fury in the Slaughterhouse) noticed Subwave and became their producer to offer them a record deal in 2006 on his own label Burrofeliz and the band recorded 2007 their third album named Fast Forward in the Goldgrube record studio.

In autumn 2008 a maxi cd titled The End of our Days announced their new upcoming fourth album. Short after the release Rik Leuchauer left the band and was replaced by the new bass player Frank Schoofs, but both were involved in the recordings of the new album with the slightly ironic name A Tribute to.... The record is often presented as a kind of greatest hits collection.

Discography

Full length records 
 A Tribute to..., 2009 by Subwave/Burrofeliz
 The End of our Days (Maxi), 2008 by Subwave/Burrofeliz
 FAST FORWARD, 2007 by Burrofeliz/SPV
 REJECT, 2002 by Subwave/OSP
 KURT COBAIN, 2000 by Subwave

Compilations 
 BEST OF INDEPENDENT by One Kind Radio/Chicago
 Independent Compilation by Anty-Industry/USA
 HITPACK Vol. 1 by Deshima-Music
 COLLEGE - ALTERNATIVE Vol. 1 by CDReview
 FINEST NOISE Vol. 6 by BluNoise

References 

 Interview radio MDR Sputnik
 Rock Hard Magazine

External links 
 official homepage
 record company

Musical groups established in 1997
German post-grunge groups
German rock music groups